Maryland Route 452 (MD 452) is a state highway in the U.S. state of Maryland.  Known as Friendship Road, the state highway runs  from U.S. Route 50 (US 50) near Berlin north to MD 575 in Friendship in northern Worcester County.  MD 452 was built as a cut-off between US 213 (now US 50) and US 113 (now MD 575) in the early 1930s.

Route description

MD 452 begins at an intersection with US 50 (Ocean Gateway) to the northeast of Berlin.  Seahawk Road continues south from the intersection, providing access to Stephen Decatur High School and Stephen Decatur Middle School.  MD 452 immediately encounters the west end of MD 707 (Grays Corner Road), which was formerly US 213.  The state highway heads north as a two-lane undivided road through a mix of farms and residences, crossing Taylorville Creek.  MD 452 reaches its northern terminus at MD 575 (Worcester Highway), the old alignment of US 113, in the hamlet of Friendship.

History
MD 452 was constructed between 1930 and 1933 from US 213 (now MD 707) to US 113 (now MD 575).  The state highway was extended south a short distance to its present terminus when the US 50 divided highway was completed in 1950.

Junction list

See also

References

External links

MDRoads: MD 452

452
Maryland Route 452